Sanshō may refer to:

Sanshō (sumo), three special prizes awarded at official sumo tournaments
Sanshō (spice), name of a plant, Zanthoxylum piperitum, also known as "Japanese pepper" or "Korean pepper"
, a 1954 film directed by Kenji Mizoguchi

People with the given name Sanshō include:
Kawarazaki Sanshō (1838–1903), Japanese kabuki actor
Sansho Shinsui (1947–2017), Japanese film and television actor

See also
Acmella oleracea, species of flowering herb sometimes called "Sanshō buttons"
Sichuan pepper, Zanthoxylum bungeanum, not to be confused with the Japanese spice sanshō
Sanshou, Chinese self-defense system and combat sport

Japanese masculine given names